Tokarnia  is a village in the administrative district of Gmina Chęciny, within Kielce County, Świętokrzyskie Voivodeship, in south-central Poland.

The village has a population of 1,400.

In Tokarnia there is an open-air Kielce Countryside Museum (Muzeum Wsi Kieleckiej - Park Etnograficzny w Tokarni), with examples of old countryside architecture. The museum is situated just by the European route E77 (Kielce-Kraków part).

References

Villages in Kielce County